Belén Cuevas López (born 14 August 1967) is a road cyclist from Spain. She represented her nation at the 1992 Summer Olympics in the women's road race.

References

External links
 profile at sports-reference.com

Spanish female cyclists
Cyclists at the 1992 Summer Olympics
Olympic cyclists of Spain
Living people
People from Reinosa
1967 births
Cyclists from Cantabria